Robert Frisch (born 2 November 1961) is a South African cricketer. He played in one first-class match for Border in 1980/81.

See also
 List of Border representative cricketers

References

External links
 

1961 births
Living people
South African cricketers
Border cricketers
Cricketers from Cape Town